The 2008 ACC Trophy Elite was a cricket tournament in Kuala Lumpur, Malaysia, taking place between 25 July and 3 August 2008. It gives Associate and Affiliate members of the Asian Cricket Council experience of international one-day cricket and also forms part of the regional qualifications for the ICC World Cricket League

Teams
After the 2006 ACC Trophy it was decided to split the tournament into two divisions. The placement of teams in the divisions was based on their final positions in the last ACC Trophy. The top ten teams went on to take part in the 2008 ACC Trophy Elite and the remaining teams were placed in a lower division, the 2009 ACC Trophy Challenge. The teams that made it into the Trophy Elite were:

Squads

Match Officials 

 Tanvir Ahmed (Bangladesh)
 D Ekanayake (Sri Lanka)
 SS Hazare (India)
 Aminul Islam (Bangladesh)
 RR Jadeja (India)
 GF Labrooy (Sri Lanka)
 Khalid Mahmood (Pakistan)
 SJ Phadkar (India)
 BB Pradhan (Nepal)
 SS Prasad (Singapore)
 Anisur Rahman (Bangladesh)
 Samiur Rahman (Bangladesh)
 RJ Ratnayake (Sri Lanka)
 Aziz-ur-Rehman (Pakistan)
 Abdus Sami (Pakistan)
 SH Sarathkumara (Sri Lanka)
 Anis Siddiqi (Pakistan)
 Iqbal Sikander (Pakistan)

Group stage

Group A

Points Tables 
Green denotes teams going into the semifinals.

Fixtures and results

Group B

Points Tables 
Green denotes teams going into the semifinals.

Fixtures and results

Semifinals

Playoffs

Final

Final Placings

Statistics

References

External links
ACC Trophy Elite 2008 - Official Site

ACC Trophy
International cricket competitions in 2008
Acc Trophy Elite, 2008
International cricket competitions in Malaysia